The Latin Archbishopric of Thebes is the see of Thebes in the period in which its incumbents belonged to the Latin or Western Church. This period began in 1204 with the installation in the see of a Catholic archbishop following the Fourth Crusade, while the Orthodox metropolitan bishop fled the city.

The Latin archbishop of Thebes was the senior-most of the Catholic clergy in the Duchy of Athens, which despite its name had its capital at Thebes. The archbishopric survived as a Latin residential see until 1456, when the duchy fell to the Ottoman Empire.

The see was later revived as a titular see, and has been vacant since 1965.

Like other Latin sees in the Latin states of Greece, the names and dates of election of the incumbents during the first century of its existence are unknown, as they were rarely communicated to the papal court.
Along with many of his counterparts from other Latin sees of Greece, the anonymous archbishop of Thebes participated in the Fourth Council of the Lateran in 1215. In 1217–18 the archbishop was engaged in a dispute with the Latin Patriarch of Constantinople, Gervasius, who claimed direct jurisdiction over the monasteries in the duchy of Athens and intervened in the administration of the Thebean archdiocese.

Residential archbishops

Titular archbishops

References

Sources 
 

 
Lists of Roman Catholic bishops and archbishops
Roman Catholic dioceses in the Crusader states
Former Roman Catholic dioceses in Greece
Catholic titular sees in Europe
Latin Archbishopric of Thebes